Akindo Sushiro is a Japanese multinational conveyor belt sushi specialty store. It is headquartered in Suita, Osaka.

Background 
Sushiro is currently the largest conveyor belt sushi company in turnover. The total number of customers in a year is about 140 million, which is more than the total population of Japan. There are more than 500 restaurants in its establish place, Japan. The first overseas branch opened in Seoul, South Korea, and currently there are 14 branches in South Korea. In 2017, Taiwan Sushiro Co., Ltd. was established. On 15 June 2018, Taiwan "Sushiro No. 1 shop" was opened in Taipei, it became the second overseas base of Sushiro after South Korea. In August 2019, it opened its first branch in Hong Kong, it became the third overseas base. In the same month, it also opened its first branch in Singapore. The chain opened its first chain in China in September 2021, starting in Guangzhou.

Incidents

Japan 
A Japanese Consumer Affairs Agency report released in June 2022 shows multiple Sushiro chains in the country being accused of false advertising, by using the "limited offer" term to promote its sea urchin and crab sushis while having no stock of these sushis in most stores.

In 29 January 2023, one 48-second Instagram Stories video was reportedly viewed over 22 million times. It showed Juzo Takai, a 17-year-old student from Gifu Prefectural Ginan Technical High School in Sushiro Gifu Masakiten directly licking a soy sauce bottle and a cup before placing it back. Anxiously looking around, he continued by sucking on his finger, using it to touch sushi circling on the conveyor belts. He could be seen smiling and giving a thumbs up at the end of the video. This incident caused the stock price of Food & Life Companies, the parent company of Sushiro, to plummet. Its market value lost more than 16 billion yen. Many customers had doubts about hygiene and safety, consequently leading many to avoid dining at Sushiro. This caused so-called "Sushi Terrorism" in Japan. The sushi industry is worth an estimated ¥740bn (£4.7bn/$5.7bn), and was particularly affected due to the country's high standards of hygiene. In response to this incident, a male student voluntarily dropped out of Gifu Prefecture's Ginan Technical High School.

Taiwan 

At the beginning of 2021, a promotional event by Sushiro in Taiwan promised to serve free salmon sushi for people with the word "salmon" in their name. This caused the salmon chaos.

China 
Multiple Sushiro chains in Guangzhou, China were under fire for linguistic discrimination after the chain's supervisors stated the ban of using local Cantonese language between employees on its online chat groups. Sushiro in China later apologised for the matter, amid local boycotts.

See also 
 Salmon chaos

References

External links 
 Sushiro official website
 FOOD&LIFE COMPANIES (Japan)

Sushi restaurants
Restaurant chains
Multinational food companies
Companies based in Osaka Prefecture
Restaurants established in 1984
Japanese companies established in 1984
Retail companies established in 1984
Companies listed on the Tokyo Stock Exchange